WAIP may refer to:

 WAIP-LP, a low-power radio station (103.9 FM) licensed to serve Gulfport, Mississippi, United States
 WHUC, a radio station (1230 AM) licensed to serve Hudson, New York, United States, which held the call sign WAIP in 2012